Tabaseyn-e Pain (also Romanized as Ţabaseyn-e Pā’īn; also known as Ţabaseyn-e Soflá, Ţabasān, Ţabaseyn, Ţabasīn, and Tabbasein) is a village in Bandan Rural District, in the Central District of Nehbandan County, South Khorasan Province, Iran. At the 2006 census, its population was 925, in 171 families.

References 

Populated places in Nehbandan County